The Autonomous University of Baja California Sur (in ) is a Mexican public university based in the state of Baja California Sur.

Its library holds over 42,000 volumes.

References

External links
 Official website

Autonomous University of Baja California Sur
Educational institutions established in 1976
1976 establishments in Mexico
La Paz, Baja California Sur